Deep Lake is a  lake in White River National Forest, in Colorado, United States.  It is the site of Deep Lake Campground.

External links

Lakes of Colorado